Augustine Makalakalane (born 15 September 1963) is a South African former footballer who played at both professional and international levels as a midfielder.

Makalakalane played club football in South Africa for Jomo Cosmos, Mamelodi Sundowns and Wits University and was the first South African to play in Switzerland having represented FC Zürich and FC Baden. He also earned 14 caps for the South African national side between 1992 and 1996, and was part of the squad that won the 1996 African Cup of Nations.

After retiring, he worked as coach, first taking charge of Black Leopards in 2002 and then the South Africa women's national football team until 2011, when he was dismissed for sexually harassing his players. He was later appointed as soccer institute coach at the North-West University.

References

External links

1963 births
Living people
South African soccer players
South African expatriate soccer players
South Africa international soccer players
1996 African Cup of Nations players
Association football midfielders
Association football forwards
Bidvest Wits F.C. players
Mamelodi Sundowns F.C. players
Jomo Cosmos F.C. players
Expatriate footballers in Switzerland
FC Zürich players
FC Baden players
Swiss Super League players
South African soccer managers
South African expatriate sportspeople in Switzerland
Association football controversies
South Africa women's national soccer team managers